The 2004 American Le Mans Series season was the 34th season for the IMSA GT Championship, and the sixth under the American Le Mans Series banner.  It was a series for Le Mans Prototypes (LMP) and Grand Touring (GT) race cars divided into 4 classes: LMP1, LMP2, GTS, and GT.  It began March 20, 2004 and ended October 16, 2004 after 9 races.

Schedule
Three circuits were added to the 2004 schedule, replacing three events which did not return from 2003.  The sprint event at Road Atlanta along with Circuit Trois-Rivières and the Miami, Florida street circuit were removed, while Mid-Ohio Sports Car Course and Portland International Raceway both returned once again.  These were joined by the addition of Lime Rock Park. The removal of Trois-Rivières rendered Mosport as the only race outside the United States.

Season results

Overall winner in bold.

Teams Championship

Points are awarded to the top 10 finishers in the following order:
 20-16-13-10-8-6-4-3-2-1
Exceptions were for the 4 Hour Monterey Sports Car Championships was scored in the following order:
 23-19-16-13-11-9-7-6-5-4
And for the 12 Hours of Sebring and Petit Le Mans which award the top 10 finishers in the following order:
 26-22-19-16-14-12-10-9-8-7

Cars failing to complete 70% of the winner's distance are not awarded points.  Teams only score the points of their highest finishing entry in each race.

LMP1 Standings

LMP2 Standings

GTS Standings

GT Standings

External links
 American Le Mans Series homepage
 IMSA Archived ALMS Results and Points

American Le Mans Series season
American Le Mans Series season
American Le Mans Series seasons